Michael Magee (born September 2, 1984) is an American former soccer player who last played for LA Galaxy in Major League Soccer as a forward. In the 2013 season with the Chicago Fire, Magee scored 21 goals and was named the MLS MVP.

Club career

MetroStars

Magee graduated from USSF's Bradenton Academy he entered the 2003 MLS SuperDraft, where the MetroStars traded the previous year's third overall selection, Brad Davis, to acquire Magee with the fourth overall pick.

With Metro coach Bob Bradley familiar with Magee from his youth soccer days, the youngster quickly stepped into the Metro lineup, and played every game of the 2003 season except the meaningless finale. He became the youngest player in team history to start a game and score a goal. He scored seven goals, nearing the rookie record, which included a couple of game-winning and game-tying efforts.

When the MetroStars signed a trio of foreign strikers before the 2004 season, Magee struggled for playing time early on. But he soon found a new niche as an attacking midfielder, as his skill on the ball, leadership, precise passing, and overall intelligence made him an important part of the Metro team. Magee ended up with three goals on the season, one of them in the 90th minute to give the Metros a 2-1 win over Los Angeles Galaxy. He scored five in 2005, adding five assists. Magee followed that with three goals in an injury-filled 2006. Magee's injury woes continued in 2007 as he was limited to 7 league matches. The 2008 season saw Magee receive significant playing time as an attacking midfielder, but it was apparent that he was not fully recovered from his injuries. He was then moved to his natural forward position and had a resurgence as he scored in 3 consecutive matches, helping the club to three straight wins. He ended the 2008 season scoring five key goals, helping the club reach the MLS Playoffs.

LA Galaxy

Magee was traded to Los Angeles Galaxy in January 2009 in exchange for a 2nd round pick in the 2010 MLS SuperDraft. In his first season with Los Angeles, Magee appeared in 23 league matches scoring 2 goals. During the 2009 MLS Cup Playoffs Magee started all 4 of the team's playoff matches scoring two goals in helping lead the club to the MLS Cup Final. At the MLS 2009 Cup Final Magee scored the Galaxy's only goal but the team ended up losing during an overtime penalty shoot out.

Magee made his first professional appearance as a goalkeeper on June 25, 2011, moving to the position in the 43rd minute of a match against San Jose Earthquakes, after starting goalkeeper Donovan Ricketts was injured and reserve goalkeeper Josh Saunders received a red card for an elbow to the face of Steven Lenhart.  Magee made 4 saves, including a late stop on a 1-v-1 against Lenhart, preserving a clean sheet for the Galaxy in a 0-0 draw. It was the first time Magee had played in goal at any level of soccer. Magee had his most productive season during the 2011 campaign scoring 10 goals in all competitions for the Galaxy including 3 in the MLS playoffs, helping the Galaxy to capture the 2011 MLS Cup.

Magee has become LA's "Mr. November" due to his repeated ability to deliver goals and in form clutch performances in the post-season, having scored 8 goals in his 15 playoff matches for the team.

Chicago Fire

On May 24, 2013, Magee was traded to Chicago Fire for the MLS rights to Robbie Rogers. He made an immediate impact with the club, scoring 7 goals in his first 7 matches across all competitions.  He won the June Player of the Month Award.  The Fire missed the playoffs by three goals and Magee lost to Camilo Sanvezzo for the MLS Golden Boot.  Camilo had 22 goals and 6 assists, while Magee had 21 goals and 4 assists. On November 20, Magee along with Robbie Keane and Marco Di Vaio, was nominated for the MVP Award.  On December 5, he was named the MVP of MLS.  Magee became the first Chicago Fire player ever to win the award.

In September 2014, Magee underwent a right hip surgery to address an injury of the labrum and to repair articular surface damage.  He would miss eight months due to recovery.  In May 2015, Magee was loaned to Chicago's USL affiliate, Saint Louis FC, to begin his on-field recovery from this injury.

Return to LA Galaxy
On January 14, 2016, the Galaxy announced that Magee would return after he became a free-agent.

International career
Magee has spent time with various U.S. youth national Teams. He played in the 2003 FIFA World Youth Championship in the United Arab Emirates, scoring the game-winner against Paraguay.

In November 2013, Republic of Ireland national team captain Robbie Keane revealed that he would recommend Magee to Martin O'Neill as a possible call-up.

Magee was called up by Jürgen Klinsmann for the 2014 January Camp.  However, he was left out of the lineup on February 1 against South Korea due to food poisoning.

Personal life
Magee spent some of his earliest years living in Elmhurst, Illinois before moving away, and has lived considerable time in South Barrington. He played AYSO; one year, his team name was the "Green Slimers".

Magee and his wife, Kristen Pizzolato were married in 2012, had a daughter in 2010 and a son in 2015.

In 2018, Magee became the owner of Sneaky Fox Spirits and Sneaky Clean Hand Sanitizer in 2020.

Career statistics

Honors
Los Angeles Galaxy
 MLS Cup (2): 2011, 2012
 MLS Supporters' Shield (2): 2010, 2011
 MLS Western Conference Playoffs (3): 2009, 2011, 2012
 MLS Western Conference Regular Season (3): 2009, 2010, 2011
 MLS Player of the Month (1): March 2013
 MLS Player of the Week (2): 2011, 2013

Chicago Fire
 MLS Player of the Month (1): June 2013
 MLS Best XI (1): 2013
 MLS MVP (1): 2013

References

External links
 

1984 births
Living people
American soccer players
New York Red Bulls players
LA Galaxy players
Chicago Fire FC players
Saint Louis FC players
People from South Barrington, Illinois
Soccer players from Chicago
American people of Irish descent
New York Red Bulls draft picks
Major League Soccer players
Major League Soccer All-Stars
USL Championship players
United States men's youth international soccer players
United States men's under-20 international soccer players
Association football forwards
Association football midfielders
People from Elmhurst, Illinois